Mohitabad (also Romanized as Moḩīţābād; also known as Moḩīţābād-e Seyyedhā and Mahītabād) is a village in Rivand Rural District, in the Central District of Nishapur County, Razavi Khorasan Province, Iran. At the 2006 census, its population was 876, in 227 families.

References 

Populated places in Nishapur County